Peru competed at the 2014 Summer Youth Olympics, in Nanjing, China from 16 August to 28 August 2014.

Athletics

Peru qualified five athletes based on the 31 May 2014 South American Championships

Qualification Legend: Q=Final A (medal); qB=Final B (non-medal); qC=Final C (non-medal); qD=Final D (non-medal); qE=Final E (non-medal)

Boys
Track & road events

Field Events

Girls
Track & road events

Badminton

Peru qualified one athlete based on the 2 May 2014 BWF Junior World Rankings.

Singles

Doubles

Beach volleyball

Peru boys' pair qualified based on the Ranking of the South American Youth Beach volleyball Tour.

Football

Peru qualified 1 boys' team by virtue of winning the 2013 South American Under-15 Football Championship.

Boys' Tournament

Roster

 Rodolfo Angeles
 Fabrian Caytuiro
 Ray Contreras
 Ivan Cruz
 Franklin Gil
 Carlos Huerto
 Jose Inga
 Quillan Melendez
 Alessandro Milesi
 Christopher Olivares
 Fernando Pacheco
 Anthony Quijano
 Ismarl Quispe
 Fabio Rojas
 Christian Sanchez
 Marco Saravia
 Gerald Tavara
 Brayan Velarde

Group stage

Semi-final

Gold medal match

Gymnastics

Artistic Gymnastics

Peru qualified two athletes based on its performance at the 2014 Junior Pan American Artistic Gymnastics Championships.

Boys

Girls

Judo

Peru qualified one athlete based on its performance at the 2013 Cadet World Judo Championships.

Individual

Team

Rowing

Peru qualified one boat based on its performance at the Latin American Qualification Regatta.

Qualification Legend: FA=Final A (medal); FB=Final B (non-medal); FC=Final C (non-medal); FD=Final D (non-medal); SA/B=Semifinals A/B; SC/D=Semifinals C/D; R=Repechage

Sailing

Peru qualified two boats based on its performance at the Byte CII Central & South American Continental Qualifiers. Peru later qualified one more boat based on its performance at the Techno 293 Central & South American Continental Qualifiers.

Swimming

Peru qualified two swimmers.

Boys

Girls

Tennis

Peru qualified two athletes based on the 9 June 2014 ITF World Junior Rankings.

Singles

Doubles

Weightlifting

Peru qualified 1 quota in the boys' and girls' events based on the team ranking after the 2014 Weightlifting Youth Pan American Championships.

Boys

Girls

Wrestling

Peru qualified one athlete based on its performance at the 2014 Pan American Cadet Championships.

Boys

References

Nations at the 2014 Summer Youth Olympics
2014 in Peruvian sport
Peru at the Youth Olympics